The Bikeriders is an upcoming American drama film written and directed by Jeff Nichols. It tells a fictional story inspired by the 1968 photo-book of the same name by Danny Lyon, and stars an ensemble cast that includes Tom Hardy, Austin Butler, Jodie Comer, Michael Shannon, Boyd Holbrook, Norman Reedus, and Mike Faist.

Premise
Set in the 1960s, it follows the rise of a fictional Midwestern motorcycle club. Seen through the lives of its members, the club evolves over the course of a decade from a gathering place for local outsiders into a more sinister gang, threatening the original group's unique way of life.

Cast

Production
In October 2018, Jeff Nichols revealed he had been thinking about making a biker film set in the 1960s for five years, although he did not at that stage have a script, and mentioned the idea on the set of Long Way Back Home to Michael Shannon who reportedly told him "You've been talking about that damn idea for so long. You're never gonna make that [film]". Nichols wrote the screenplay from his original story idea and began forming the project in the spring of 2022, New Regency began to produce in May 2022. 

It was announced in August 2022 that Nichols would also direct the film, with Jodie Comer, Austin Butler, and Tom Hardy being cast. Michael Shannon, Boyd Holbrook, and Damon Herriman were added to the cast later in the month.  In September, Toby Wallace, Emory Cohen, Beau Knapp, Karl Glusman, and Happy Anderson joined the ensemble cast. Norman Reedus and Mike Faist would be added to the cast the following month.

Principal photography began in Cincinnati, Ohio in October 2022 and wrapped that December.

References

External links

Upcoming films
20th Century Studios films
American drama films
American gang films
Films based on non-fiction books
Films directed by Jeff Nichols
Films set in the 1960s
Films shot in Ohio
Outlaw biker films
Regency Enterprises films
Upcoming English-language films